Seward ( Dena'ina: Tl'ubugh) is an incorporated home rule city in Alaska, United States.

With a population of 2,717 people as of the 2020 census,
 Seward is the fourth-largest city in the Kenai Peninsula Borough, behind Kenai, Homer, and the borough seat of Soldotna. The city is named for former U.S.A Secretary of State William H. Seward, who orchestrated the United States' purchase of Alaska from the Russian Empire in 1867 while serving in this position as part of President Andrew Johnson's administration.

Seward is the southern terminus of the Alaska Railroad and the historic starting point of the original Iditarod Trail to Interior Alaska, with Mile 0 of the trail marked on the shoreline at the southern end of town.

History

In 1793, Alexander Baranov of the Shelikhov-Golikov company (precursor of the Russian-American Company) established a fur trade post on Resurrection Bay where Seward is today and had a three-masted vessel, the Phoenix, built at the post by James Shields, an English shipwright in Russian service.

The 1939 Slattery Report on Alaskan development identified the region as one of the areas where new settlements would be established through Jewish immigration. This plan was never implemented.

Seward was an important port for the military buildup in Alaska during World War II.  Fort Raymond was established in Seward along the Resurrection River to protect the community.  An Army airfield built in Seward during the war later became Walseth Air Force Base. Both of the military facilities were closed shortly after the end of the war.

A large portion of Seward was damaged by shaking and a local tsunami during the 1964 Alaska earthquake.

Geography

The northern city limits are demarcated by the lower reaches of the Resurrection River, but extend east past the river's mouth at the northern end of Resurrection Bay to include parts of the bay's extreme northeastern shore, including the beach at the mouth of Fourth of July Creek and the grounds of Spring Creek Correctional Center just inland. To the south, the city limits extend to the unincorporated community of Lowell Point, while the east and west sides of the city are constrained by Resurrection Bay and the steep slopes of Mount Marathon.

Nearby settlements include the aforementioned Lowell Point to the south, as well as the census-designated places of Bear Creek and Moose Pass further north. The nearest incorporated city is Soldotna, about 90 miles (by road) to the northwest.

Climate
Depending on the isotherm, Seward has a subpolar oceanic climate (Köppen Cfc) or a subarctic climate (Köppen Dfc), but it experiences relatively moderate temperatures compared to the rest of the state throughout the year due to the influence of the nearby Gulf of Alaska. Only one month, January, sees an average daily high temperature below freezing, and temperatures below zero degrees Fahrenheit are rare. The oceanic influence also imparts a high level of precipitation, with the heaviest amounts occurring during the fall and winter months.

Economy
Seward's local economy is largely driven by the commercial fishing industry and seasonal tourism. Many lodging facilities, restaurants and shops in the city cater mainly to tourists, and are only open for business during the summer tourist season, generally regarded as running from mid-May through mid-September. Other major employers in the city include the state-run Spring Creek Correctional Center, the Alaska Department of Labor and Workforce Development's AVTEC vocational school, and the local Providence Health & Services branch, which also serves as the community's main medical center.

Fishing 
Seward is the site of an annual salmon run which, in the 1920s, came to "countless millions" and supported a community of fisherman of mainly Scandinavian origin.  It was then the headquarters of the halibut fleet.

Seward is among the most lucrative commercial fisheries ports in the United States, according to reports from the National Marine Fisheries Service. Per the most recent yearly data available, for 2016, commercial fishing boats in Seward offloaded approximately 13,500 tons of fish and shellfish, valued at about $42 million. Over the course of the decade from 2007 to 2016, around $545 million in commercial seafood passed through Seward's harbor.

Tourism 
Owing to its position at the southern terminus of the Alaska Railroad and well-developed road links to Anchorage and the rest of the Kenai Peninsula, Seward is both a major northern end-port for several major cruise ship lines that host Alaskan cruises, such as Norwegian, Royal Caribbean, Holland America, and Celebrity Cruises, and a common destination for general Alaskan tourism.

Seward also has a minor military installation and is the home port of the USCGC Mustang.

Demographics

Seward first appeared on the 1910 U.S. Census as an unincorporated village. It formally incorporated in 1912.

As of the census of 2000, there were 2,830 people, 917 households, and 555 families residing in the city. The racial makeup of the city was 72.1% White, 2.4% Black or African American, 16.7% Native American, 1.8% Asian, 0.2% Pacific Islander, 0.9% from other races, and 5.9% from two or more races. 2.4% of the population were Hispanic or Latino of any race.

There were 917 households, out of which 35.7% had children under the age of 18 living with them, 44.6% were married couples living together, 12.1% had a female householder with no husband present, and 39.4% were non-families. 30.8% of all households were made up of individuals, and 7.1% had someone living alone who was 65 years of age or older. The average household size was 2.40 and the average family size was 3.04.

In the city, the age distribution of the population shows 21.9% under the age of 18, 9.0% from 18 to 24, 35.9% from 25 to 44, 25.7% from 45 to 64, and 7.5% who were 65 years of age or older. The median age was 37 years. For every 100 females, there were 150.2 males. For every 100 females age 18 and over, there were 166.6 males.

The median income for a household in the city was $44,306, and the median income for a family was $54,904. Males had a median income of $36,900 versus $30,508 for females. The per capita income for the city was $20,360. About 8.3% of families and 10.6% of the population were below the poverty line, including 12.7% of those under age 18 and 7.9% of those age 65 or over.

Government and infrastructure

The City of Seward employs a council–manager style of government, with a seven-member city council elected by the citizens, as well as a council-appointed city manager, city attorney and city clerk, responsible for all local administration including police, fire, utilities, and harbor management. At the borough level, Seward is situated in Kenai Peninsula Borough District 6, which has one seat on the nine-member borough council. This council oversees area-wide issues such as education, waste management, zoning and taxation assessment.The United States Postal Service maintains a post office in Seward with zip code 99664.

In the Alaska House of Representatives, the city is in the 29th District, represented by Republican Ben Carpenter.

In the Alaska Senate, the city is in District O, represented by Republican Peter Micciche.

Education
The Kenai Peninsula Borough School District operates schools in Seward, including Seward Elementary School, Seward Middle School, and Seward High School.

Transportation

Seward is unusual among most small Alaskan communities in that it has road access in the Seward Highway from Seward to Anchorage, a National Scenic Byway and All-American Road, which also brings it bus service. Seward is also the southern terminus of the Alaska Railroad with the railroad serving the Port of Seward which is capable of accommodating ocean going vessels. This keeps the port busy with freight coming on and off the trains, but also makes Seward a primary end point for north-bound cruise ships. Cruise ship passengers disembark and often take the train or bus farther north to Anchorage, Denali, or other Alaskan attractions.  The Alaska Railroad operates passenger service into Seward on a seasonal basis via the 
Coastal Classic train.

Seward is a very bike friendly community. A paved bike path runs from the downtown business district along the waterfront, through the harbor and along the highway to mile 4.5. Bikes are available for rent and there are guided bike tours of the area.

Alaska Marine Highway (ferry) service was discontinued at the end of the 2005. State ferry connections are now available in Whittier (90 miles North) or Homer (150 miles by highway).

Seward Airport (PAWD/SWD) is home to general aviation services and flight-seeing operators. Bus connections are also available.

International sister cities

 Obihiro, Hokkaido, Japan (1968)
 Kushiro, Hokkaido, Japan (1982)
 Yeosu, South Korea (informal)

Notable people

Benny Benson (1913–1972), Alaska Native and designer of what would become the Alaskan state flag
 Lydia Jacoby (born 2004), 2020 Summer Olympics swimming gold medalist and first Alaskan to qualify to compete in swimming at an Olympic Games
Harry Kawabe (1890–1969), Japanese-American businessman sent to internment camp during World War II

Attractions and points of interest

Mount Marathon and its famous Mount Marathon Race
Kenai Fjords National Park with its easily accessible Exit Glacier
Alaska SeaLife Center
Seward Silver Salmon Derby
Seward Polar Bear Jump-Off
Seward Spring Break Up Festival
Seward Music and Arts Festival, every year in September
Balto Film Fest, last weekend of July
The ruins of the Jesse Lee Home for Children
Boat tours to Holgate Glacier in Kenai Fjords National Park

References

External links

 
 City of Seward official website
 Seward Chamber of Commerce and Conference & Visitors Bureau
 

 
Cities in Alaska
Cities in Kenai Peninsula Borough, Alaska
Kenai Mountains-Turnagain Arm National Heritage Area
Populated coastal places in Alaska on the Pacific Ocean